The Chatla Wetland (Chatla) is a seasonal wetland located in Cachar district in the Indian state of Assam.

Economy 
During the winter season rice cultivation is done. From March onward this land fills with water and becomes a lake. Chatla haor was the main indigenous tea garden during British rule. 

Chatla is known for its fishery and produces fish for all districts in southern Assam. Chatla produces all types of fish and the specialty of Chatla is its Bhujia fish, Tangra fish.

History 
People came from Kolkata, Bihar, Orissa, from about 1850 to 1860. In particular, the two Bengali dialects were dominated by the Bengali Bengali Rari and Jharkhandi who were prominent among them. 

From 1961 to 1971, people of different states of Bangladesh came to Chatla Haur and dominated that society.

Demographics 
The residents of Chatla are mainly of Bengali. Sylheti is the primary language spoken by the Bengali population. 

 The Rari Bangla dialect is spoken by Kayastha and Chakrabarty people. 
 Jharkhandi Bangla dialect is spoken by people from communities such as Bauri, Roy, Akura, Baghdi, Dutta, Kumar, Kol.

Geography 
Chatla haor’ is a seasonal wetland where people engage in agriculture during the dry period (October–March) while the wetland provides a fishery during the wet period (April- September). Chatla is located near the second largest town of Assam, Silchar. Chatla Wetland is located in Cachar District. The depth of this lake is less when the lake overflows and the excess water channels through the Ghagra river to the Barak river and eventually flows into Bangladesh. 

The climate of Chatla is tropical. The summer is usually hot and humid, with heavy rainfall at times. The winter season starts from the month of November and continues till February. The heavy rainfall at Chatla can cause floods at times. In recent times, Chatla has seen four major floods, occurring in 1986, 1991, 2004 and 2007.

References 

Wetlands
Tourism in Assam
Cachar district
Geography of Assam